The Van Kitchen House, located south of Grayson, Kentucky, off Kentucky Route 7, is a saddlebag log house built in about 1838.  It has also been known as the Elijah Horton House.  It was listed on the National Register of Historic Places in 1974.

It is a two-story two-unit dwelling built of hewn logs and frame lapsiding, upon stone piers, built by or for Elijah Horton.  The house was moved to its current location overlooking Grayson Lake in 1967.

References

Houses on the National Register of Historic Places in Kentucky
Houses completed in 1838
National Register of Historic Places in Carter County, Kentucky
1838 establishments in Kentucky
Log houses in the United States
Log buildings and structures on the National Register of Historic Places in Kentucky
Relocated buildings and structures in Kentucky